
Year 391 (CCCXCI) was a common year starting on Wednesday (link will display the full calendar) of the Julian calendar. At the time, it was known as the Year of the Consulship of Tatianus and Symmachus (or, less frequently, year 1144 Ab urbe condita). The denomination 391 for this year has been used since the early medieval period, when the Anno Domini calendar era became the prevalent method in Europe for naming years.

Events 
 By place 
 Roman Empire 
 Emperor Theodosius I establishes Christianity as the official state religion. All non-Christian temples in the Roman Empire are closed. The eternal fire in the Temple of Vesta at the Roman Forum is extinguished, and the Vestal Virgins are disbanded.
 Quintus Aurelius Symmachus, urban prefect of Rome, pleads for traditional cult practices. He petitions Theodosius I to re-open the pagan temples, but is opposed by Ambrose.

 Asia 
 A Rouran chief named Heduohan (曷多汗) is defeated and killed in battle against the Toba Northern Wei Dynasty. Surviving Rouran move west towards the Gaoche, led by Heduohan's son and successor, Shelun.
 King Gwanggaeto the Great of Goguryeo (Korea) ascends to the throne.

 By topic 
 Literature 
 Flames destroy the great Library of Alexandria, established in the Mouseion in the fourth century BC. Among the items lost in the fire are works of science, including parchments by the Greek astronomer Aristarchus of Samos asserting that the Earth orbits the Sun, and dozens of dramatic works by Euripides and Sophocles.

 Religion 
 Patriarch Theophilus destroys all pagan temples in Alexandria under orders from Theodosius I. Christians go on an iconoclastic rampage, smashing religious symbols or monuments through the city and destroying the Temple of Serapis. The "Order of Monks" known as the Parabalani take charge of patrolling the streets.

Births 
Flavius Aetius, Roman general (Magister militum) of part Gothic heritage. (d.454)

Deaths 
 Heduohan, chief of the Rouran tribes (killed in battle against the Northern Wei)
 Justina, Roman empress (approximate date)
 Macarius of Egypt, Christian monk and hermit
 Peter of Sebaste, bishop of Armenia
 Zhai Liao "Heavenly Prince" (Tian Wang), founder of the Dingling state Wei

References